Alicia Alfonso (born 1963) is a Uruguayan actress.

References

1963 births
20th-century Uruguayan actresses
21st-century Uruguayan actresses
Living people
Uruguayan musical theatre actresses
Fraternity Award